Luca Altomare (born 14 January 1972) is an Italian football coach and retired midfielder.

Career
While playing for Napoli, Altomare was given the number 10 jersey and the captain's armband for a friendly against Internazionale. 

Despite getting called up to the Italy squad for the 1996 UEFA European Under-21 Championship, Altomare decided not to go because he was getting married.

References

External links

 

1972 births
Living people
Italian footballers
Italian football managers
Sportspeople from Cosenza
Association football midfielders
Cosenza Calcio 1914 players
S.S.C. Napoli players
A.C. Reggiana 1919 players
S.S.D. Lucchese 1905 players
S.P.A.L. players
Vigor Lamezia players
Cosenza Calcio players
Serie A players
Serie B players
Serie C players
Serie D players
Italy under-21 international footballers
Serie D managers
Footballers from Calabria